Squads for the 1964 AFC Asian Cup played in Israel.

Israel

Head coach:  Yosef Merimovich

India

Head coach:  Harry Wright

Hong Kong

Head coach:  Fei Chun Wah(費春華)

South Korea
The Korea Football Association sent the B team, as the main players played in the Summer Olympics qualification around the same time frame.

Head coach: Park Il-kap

References

External links
https://web.archive.org/web/20140102194024/http://rdfc.com.ne.kr/int/skor-intres-1960.html

AFC Asian Cup squads